My Gear and Your Gown is a 2020 Thai television series starring Pahun Jiyacharoen (Marc), Pawin Kulkarunyawich (Win), Chayakorn Jutamat (JJ), Pattadon Janngeon (Fiat) and Napat Patcharachavalit (Un).

Directed by Siwaj Sawatmaneekul, who also directed Love by Chance and Until We Meet Again, and produced by GMMTV together with Studio Wabi Sabi, the series was one of the three television series launched by WeTV together with GMMTV, Studio Wabi Sabi and TV Thunder on 23 June 2020. It premiered on WeTV on 14 September 2020, airing on Mondays at 18:00 ICT. The series concluded on 30 November 2020.

Synopsis 
Dr. Pai (Pawin Kulkarunyawich) is a medical student who previously led the school's academic club. With glasses on while growing up, he didn't have that confidence with his look and has never believed in love. Meanwhile, Itt (Pahun Jiyacharoen) is an engineering student and previously led the school's sports club. With his dominating presence, fate brings him back to his enemy who wears a dust grey medical gown earring.

Cast and characters 
Below are the cast of the series:

Main 
 Pahun Jiyacharoen (Marc) as Itt
 Pawin Kulkarunyawich (Win) as Pai
 Chayakorn Jutamat (JJ) as Waan
 Pattadon Janngeon (Fiat) as Pure
 Napat Patcharachavalit (Un) as Folk

Supporting 
 Neen Suwanamas as Beau
 Intira Jaroenpura as Ms. Walailak Jaijong (school teacher)
 Phollawat Manuprasert (Tom) as Pai's father
 Nicole Theriault (Nikki) as Pai's mother
 Amarin Nitibhon (Am) as Itt's father
 Ratchanok Sangchuto (Nok) as Itt's mother
 Chonwari Chutiwatkhotrachai (Am) as Kai
 Wanwimol Jaenasavamethee (June) as Pang

Guest role 
 Surat Permpoonsavat (Yacht) as Nickie ( 3, 10, 11)
 Kris Songsamphant (Karisa) as Pure's fling ( 3)
 Chiwpreecha Thitichaya (Olive) as June (Ep. 4)
 Wanut Sangtianprapai (Mix) as Pure's ex (Ep. 4)
 Samantha Melanie Coates as Freshy Boy & Girl emcee (Ep. 11)

Soundtrack

References

External links 
My Gear and Your Gown on WeTV
GMMTV

Television series by GMMTV
2020 Thai television series debuts
Thai romance television series
Thai boys' love television series